Tregubov is a Russian masculine surname, its feminine counterpart is Tregubova. It may refer to
Aleksey Tregubov (born 1971), Belarusian cross-country skier
Ivan Tregubov (1930–1992), Russian ice hockey defenceman
Maria Tregubova (born 1984), Moldovan swimmer
Nikita Tregubov (born 1995), Russian skeleton racer
Pavel Tregubov (born 1971), Russian chess grandmaster
Viktor Tregubov (born 1965), Russian weightlifter
Vitali Tregubov (born 1974), Kazakhstani ice hockey defenceman
Yelena Tregubova (born 1973), Russian journalist
Yuri Tregubov (1913–2000), Russian writer